The list of banks in Cocos (Keeling) Islands, Australia  include

Commonwealth Bank

Investment banks:
ANZ Bank
Bank Mandiri (PT Bank Mandiri)
Westpac, etc.

See also 

Banknotes of the Cocos (Keeling) Islands

References 

Economy of the Cocos (Keeling) Islands
Cocos (Keeling) Islands